Daniel LaRusso is a fictional character and the protagonist of The Karate Kid franchise. He is the protagonist of The Karate Kid's film trilogy and one of the two protagonists (alongside Johnny Lawrence) in its spin-off series Cobra Kai. 

He is portrayed by Ralph Macchio.

Overview
Daniel LaRusso was born in Newark, New Jersey on December 18, 1966, into an Italian-American family. When he was eight years old, his father David LaRusso died after a 2-year battle with stomach cancer. Daniel's mother Lucille never remarried. In September 1984, Daniel and Lucille moved to Reseda, California, after Lucille accepted a job offer at a computer firm. Shortly after moving to California, Daniel meets and starts a rivalry with Johnny Lawrence, the two-time winner of the All Valley Under-18 Karate Championship after Daniel befriended his ex-girlfriend Ali Mills. Luckily for Daniel, after being jumped by Johnny and his friends, he met Mr. Miyagi, the maintenance man at his apartment, who becomes his karate mentor and also a very good friend of his, as well as a father figure. It's through this training that Daniel became skilled enough to defeat Johnny in the tournament's final match and become the new champion. Despite their mutual respect afterwards, Daniel and Johnny become rivals.

Over the summer, Daniel gets to spend more time with Mr. Miyagi as they go to Okinawa, where Daniel ends up meeting a girl named Kumiko who becomes his love interest and eventual girlfriend along with also getting in a rivalry with Chozen, who is Sato's karate student and nephew. He ends up defeating Chozen in a fight to the death, although instead of killing him, he obeys Mr. Miyagi's teachings and instead shows mercy to Chozen. Daniel is able to pick up one more karate championship in the All-Valley Tournament after being forced to compete in the tournament and defeats national karate champion Mike Barnes, becoming a 2-time champion, and ending Terry Silver and John Kreese's vision of opening up multiple Cobra Kai dojos all across the valley.

By 2018, Daniel is the owner of a successful car dealership in Southern California, is married to his co-owner, Amanda, with whom they have two children named Samantha (nicknamed Sam) and Anthony. They live in a large home with a swimming pool in Encino. Despite his success as an adult, Daniel's interest in karate reignites after LaRusso learns of the return of the Cobra Kai dojo, now run by Lawrence. This drives Daniel to reopen Miyagi-Do, passing on the teachings of the late Mr. Miyagi to a new generation of students, leading to a massive rivalry between the two dojos and its students.

Young Daniel LaRusso

The Karate Kid (1984)
 
Widowed mother Lucille LaRusso uproots her only child, Daniel, from their home in New Jersey and moves them both to the South Seas Apartments in Reseda, California. Daniel is invited by his new neighbor, Freddy Fernandez, to a beach party, where he meets Ali Mills. He also encounters and is beaten in a fight by her old boyfriend Johnny Lawrence. During his first month in school, Daniel is constantly bullied by Johnny and his Cobra Kai gang. At the school's Halloween dance, Daniel attempts to get back at Johnny by placing a hose above the toilet stall where Johnny is rolling a joint whilst listening to his Walkman, getting him wet. However, his scheme backfires, and he is chased by Johnny and his gang, who corner him against the fence of his apartment building and assault him until Mr. Miyagi, the apartment's maintenance man, scales the fence, intervenes and saves Daniel. The next day, Mr. Miyagi confronts Cobra Kai sensei John Kreese and proposes that Daniel and Johnny settle their feud in the upcoming All Valley Under-18 Karate Championships tournament on December 19. Kreese agrees, but warns that if they do not show up at the tournament, both Daniel and Mr. Miyagi will be declared fair game to Cobra Kai.

Daniel is initially upset with Mr. Miyagi over the arrangement, but Mr. Miyagi assures him that with the proper karate training, he will no longer have to worry about Cobra Kai. However, Mr. Miyagi has Daniel do mundane chores at his rest house such as waxing his classic cars, sanding the wood floors, painting the fence, and painting the house. Not understanding his teacher's methods, a frustrated Daniel threatens to quit, but Mr. Miyagi shows that the chores double as defensive techniques, which Daniel has learned through muscle memory. While training, Daniel develops a relationship with Ali. Mr. Miyagi also allows Daniel to choose one of his classic cars as a gift on his 18th birthday and a reward for getting his driver's license, with Daniel choosing a yellow 1947 Ford Super De Luxe convertible.

At the tournament, Daniel unexpectedly advances toward the semi-finals. Kreese instructs Bobby Brown, one of his more compassionate students and the least vicious of Daniel's tormentors, to put Daniel out of commission. Bobby reluctantly delivers an illegal kick to Daniel's knee, getting himself disqualified while Johnny looks at Kreese in disgust. Just before Johnny is declared the winner by default, Ali informs the tournament announcer that Daniel will fight in the final round. During the fight, Daniel gains the upper hand and gives Johnny a bloody nose. Kreese orders Johnny to sweep Daniel's leg, an unethical move. In fear of his sensei, Johnny hits Daniel's bad leg with an elbow strike and receives a warning from the referee. Upon the restart of the round, Daniel wins the match after landing a crane kick to Johnny's face. Having gained respect for his nemesis, Johnny gives Daniel the trophy. Daniel celebrates the victory as Mr. Miyagi looks on, proud of his student.

The Karate Kid Part II (1986)

At the beginning of the film, as Daniel and Mr. Miyagi are leaving, they see Kreese berating Johnny for placing second, breaking his trophy and then strangling him. Miyagi intervenes and defeats him easily, comically tweaking his nose before walking away. Six months later, Daniel returns early one morning to Mr. Miyagi's house from his senior prom dressed in a tuxedo and driving the now badly beaten up car Miyagi had given him. Surprised, Mr. Miyagi asks what happened, and Daniel angrily blames Ali for the damage and says that they broke up because she is in love with "a football player from UCLA". Later, when Daniel learns that Mr. Miyagi is going to Okinawa to visit his dying father, he uses his college fund to go with him. Upon their arrival, they meet Sato, a wealthy businessman and Miyagi's former best friend. Later, Daniel meets Kumiko, a teenager who aspires to move to Tokyo and pursue a career in dancing. He also encounters Sato's nephew Chozen Toguchi, and the two become enemies after Daniel inadvertently exposes the corruption in Chozen's grocery business. One day in town, Chozen challenges Daniel to chop a row of ice sheets; however, Daniel wins Chozen's wager by using Mr. Miyagi's breathing exercise and successfully breaking all of the ice sheets. Miyagi tells Daniel to keep his winnings for college.

The Toguchi family continues to terrorize the village until a typhoon hits Okinawa. During the storm, Sato is pinned by debris from his family's dojo and rescued by Daniel and Miyagi, while Chozen runs away. Because of this, Sato lets go of his decades-old grudge with Mr. Miyagi and he offers to rebuild the village, disowning his nephew for refusing to help Daniel rescue a little girl from the typhoon. A humiliated and vengeful Chozen furiously crashes the village's Obon festival, taking Kumiko hostage and challenging Daniel to a fight to the death. Daniel and Chozen fight a brutal and bloody back-and-forth fight, and Miyagi, Sato, and the crowd use their handheld drums to motivate Daniel and defeat his opponent with the Miyagi family drum technique. After gaining the upper hand, Daniel grabs the vanquished Chozen and threatens to end his life by saying, "Live or die, man?!" Chozen chooses death, but, remembering the way Miyagi handled Kreese earlier, Daniel honks Chozen's nose and drops him to the ground. Daniel embraces Kumiko while the villagers cheer him on and Miyagi looks at him proudly.

The Karate Kid Part III (1989)

Daniel and Mr. Miyagi return to Los Angeles from Okinawa to discover that their apartment building has been sold and is undergoing demolition, leaving Daniel homeless and Miyagi unemployed. Lucille is back in New Jersey to care for Daniel's uncle Louie. Mr. Miyagi invites Daniel to stay with him for a while, and Daniel uses the rest of his college fund to help his mentor set up a bonsai tree nursery. He also befriends Jessica Andrews, who manages the pottery shop across the street.

Daniel receives an invitation to defend his championship title at the next All Valley Under-18 Karate Championships, but Mr. Miyagi advises him to ignore it, seeing no point in the competition. However, Daniel is confronted by the prodigious and undefeated karateka Mike Barnes, who threatens Daniel into defending his title and steals the shop's bonsai trees. Terry Silver, a friend of Kreese and co-founder of the Cobra Kai dojo, offers to train Daniel for the tournament. Little does Daniel know that this is an elaborate scheme devised by Kreese and Cobra Kai to exact revenge on him by physically weakening him and having him suffer defeat at Barnes' hands. Silver hopes that this will revive Cobra Kai and promises to give Barnes partial ownership of the dojo in exchange for his help. Silver's methods start to corrupt Daniel, who becomes more aggressive and short-tempered as well as alienated from Miyagi and Jessica. Realizing this after he attacks a man at the nightclub by punching him and breaking his nose due to Silver bribing the man into instigating a fight with him and Jessica, Daniel apologizes to Miyagi and Jessica and reconciles with them. Daniel confronts Silver and tells him that he no longer wishes to defend his title, after which Silver reveals his scheme. When Kreese reveals himself and Barnes attacks Daniel, Mr. Miyagi saves his pupil and agrees to train him for the tournament.

At the tournament, Barnes swiftly advances to face Daniel in the final round. He uses Silver and Kreese's tactic of scoring a point, then losing it with an illegal move (nearly getting disqualified in the process) until they reach the sudden death round. After Mr. Miyagi prevents him from conceding the match, Daniel performs a kata in the sudden death round. A confused Barnes charges at Daniel, but Daniel flips him to the ground and strikes him to win the tournament. Daniel and Miyagi embrace and celebrate their victory.

The Next Karate Kid (1994)

Although Daniel does not physically appear he is mentioned several times by Miyagi. After accidentally walking in on Julie undressing he says: "Miyagi apologize. You see, um, before, uh, live with a friend, Daniel-San. Daniel-San come Miyagi room, Miyagi go Daniel-San room. No big thing. Uh, boy is easier".

Later Miyagi quips "Miyagi have much to learn about girls. Boys easier", referring to Daniel.

Adult Daniel LaRusso

Season 1 
34 years after the first film, Daniel is happily married to his wife Amanda Steiner, and has two children, Samantha (born 2002) and Anthony (born 2005). He and his wife own the LaRusso Auto Group, a chain of car dealerships in the San Fernando Valley. He unexpectedly encounters Johnny when his car is wrecked and sent to his intake lot. Daniel, unaware that Sam was a passenger when her friends accidentally caused the wreck, offers to fix his car for free, considering Johnny an old friend. However, he later discovers that Johnny has reopened the Cobra Kai dojo in Reseda. Fearing that Johnny will create a new generation of bullies like those that he and Mr. Miyagi faced in the past, Daniel starts taking steps to undermine Cobra Kai. In addition, Daniel begins to struggle with issues within his family and business. Furthermore, his cousin Louie, who works for him at the dealership, hires a local biker gang to vandalize Johnny's car in Daniel's name in retaliation for Johnny vandalizing Daniel's billboard, forcing Daniel to fire him and give Johnny a new car as compensation.

Johnny's estranged son Robby Keene gets a job at LaRusso Auto Group to get back at his father for neglecting him in favor of Miguel. Unaware that Robby is Johnny's son, Daniel takes him in as his karate student after Louie's antics inadvertently lead Robby to visiting Daniel's house. As such, Daniel proves to be a positive influence on Robby, who later turns against his miscreant friends when they plot to rob the dealership by fighting them off with his newfound karate skills and a security camera. However, upon learning that Robby is Johnny's son, Daniel furiously banishes him from his home and dealership as punishment for his dishonesty. Nonetheless, Robby participates in the All-Valley Karate Tournament against Cobra Kai as an independent fighter unaffiliated with any dojo. In the semifinals, Robby's left shoulder is badly injured when Cobra Kai student Hawk attacks him from behind and subsequently gets disqualified in the process. After Robby apologizes to Daniel for his deception, Daniel decides to reconcile with Robby and coaches him for the duration of the final match with Miguel under the Miyagi-Do name, having been impressed with his performance. Robby loses a close fight to Miguel, who fights dishonorably by exploiting Robby's injury from the semi-finals match with Hawk. With teacher and student reconciled, Daniel plans to expand the Miyagi-Do style and philosophy with an official dojo to oppose Cobra Kai with Robby as his senior student.

Season 2 
Daniel opens the Miyagi-Do dojo and offers his lessons for free, threatening Cobra Kai's business. He allows Robby to move into his home after the utilities are shut off in Robby's apartment and Robby is evicted from his apartment due to missed bills from his mother Shannon abandoning him by going on vacation to Mexico with her boyfriend and proceeds to train him and Sam together. During this time, Daniel discovers that Kreese has returned to Cobra Kai. Unfortunately, Daniel has trouble acquiring students, most of whom are not receptive to the chore-based muscle memory training style and defensive techniques he used himself.

Daniel tries to be the bigger man after Cobra Kai upstages their demonstration at the local Valley Fest, even going so far as to refusing to make use of footage of him dispatching three purse-snatchers caught on Robby's phone. He also takes on Demetri as a student, which proves challenging at first due to Demetri's constant whining and desire to take shortcuts. However, at the prodding of Kreese and without Johnny's knowledge, Hawk leads a small group of Cobra Kai students in vandalizing Daniel's dojo and his prized convertible and stealing Mr. Miyagi's Medal of Honor in retaliation for Moon breaking up with him due to the aftermath of the mall fight with Sam, Robby and Demetri. This pushes Daniel too far and he confronts Johnny at the Cobra Kai dojo, leading to numerous students walking out to join Miyagi-Do. Despite this success, Daniel's passion leads to him missing an important lunch meeting and neglecting his auto business, forcing Amanda to run it alone as well as a loss of sales and staff, particularly when Anoush quits and goes to work for Tom Cole due to his resentment towards Daniel standing him up at the important lunch meeting.

Despite an uneasy reconciliation with Johnny, at the prodding of Amanda and Johnny's girlfriend and Miguel's mother Carmen, the rivalry flares again after a misunderstanding caused by Robby bringing Sam to spend the night at Johnny's apartment after she gets drunk at a party, resulting in Daniel furiously cutting ties with Johnny and Robby. To make matters worse, the animosity between the two begins to affect their respective students, and the growing tension between the dojos finally explodes into a massive karate war on the first day of school when Cobra Kai student Tory Nichols picks a fight with Sam in retaliation for a drunken kiss with Miguel at Moon's party. By the time the fight is over, Sam is hospitalized with broken ribs and lacerations on her right arm, while Miguel is paralyzed and accidentally crippled by Robby. Furthermore, this event also allows Kreese to take control of Cobra Kai and force Johnny out. Amanda furiously demands that Daniel close down the dojo and stop all karate activities to prevent future incidents. Feeling that he has tainted Mr. Miyagi's legacy, Daniel reluctantly and sadly obliges.

Season 3 
In the aftermath of the school fight, the LaRussos' reputation has been tarnished. People are actively avoiding their dealerships, they have had to withdraw all of their karate-themed advertising due to their reputation being tarnished by Robby's affiliation with Miyagi-Do and his actions against Miguel during the school brawl, while Sam has been afflicted with post-traumatic stress disorder due to the aftermath of her fight with Tory during the school brawl and watching Miguel accidentally being crippled by Robby at the end of the school brawl. Daniel and Johnny briefly team up to find Robby but go their separate ways after defeating a group of car thieves. Daniel finds Robby at Shannon's rehabilitation facility seeking comfort and support from Shannon, due to Robby being devastated about the aftermath of his fight with Miguel during the school brawl, and has the police take Robby into custody in order to lessen his sentence. However, Robby angrily accuses Daniel of betrayal and ends their friendship as he is apprehended by police.

Upon learning that his business rival Tom Cole had a hand in dissolving his business partnership with Doyona International, Daniel heads to Tokyo in order to salvage his business. Discouraged by his failed negotiations, and after an inspirational talk with a local bartender, Daniel visits Okinawa, where he reunites with Kumiko. After telling her of his personal and business problems, Kumiko gives Daniel closure by reading him one of Mr. Miyagi's final love letters to her aunt Yukie and also arranges him a meeting with Chozen in order to reconcile. After a few sparring sessions, Chozen gives Daniel a martial arts move scroll describing pressure point techniques. With his rivalry with Chozen now over, Daniel's business partnership is saved when he learns that Yuna, the young girl that he saved in the typhoon, is now the Vice President of Sales for Doyona.

Upon returning from his trip, Daniel finds out that Demetri's right arm was broken by Hawk during an arcade fight between Miyagi-Do and Cobra Kai and attempts to bring down Cobra Kai through legal means, but fails. They attempt to enlist Armand Zakarian to evict Kreese, but Kreese beats up Armand's nephews and retaliates by setting a cobra loose in the LaRussos' dealership. Left with no other options, Daniel and Amanda choose to resume teaching classes at Miyagi-Do and tries to get Sam's support, who is still traumatized from the aftermath of both the school fight and the laser tag fight. During a fishing trip, Daniel opens up to her about his encounter and fight with Barnes in the 1985 tournament as a means of helping her confront her fear of Tory. Sam's spirits are improved, and Daniel later teaches her a new technique by sparring with her using bo staffs.

When the local city council cancels support for the All-Valley Karate tournament due to the aftermath of the school brawl, Daniel attempts to make a case for re-opening it, but is rejected when he, Johnny, and Kreese show contempt towards each other. Just as all hope seems lost, Miguel and Sam, who have rekindled their romance, make a surprise appearance and persuade the council members to let the tournament go on. When Sam is caught making out with Miguel, Daniel has a talk with him. The two are surprised to find how much Miguel's upbringing mirrors his own (both were humble kids that grew up poor with single mothers, were bullied by richer kids, and turned to karate as a way of fighting back) and agrees to let Miguel continue dating Sam.

Daniel eventually reunites with Ali during the Christmas holidays and introduces her to Amanda, unaware that Ali had invited Johnny after a day out. During their dinner together, Ali prompts Daniel and Johnny to put aside their differences. Simultaneously, Samantha and Miguel manage to get the students of Daniel's and Johnny's dojos together at the LaRusso house to put aside their difference to bring down Cobra Kai, just in time to thwart an attack on the house led by Tory and the rest of the Cobra Kai gang.

Learning of the attack on his house, Daniel goes to Cobra Kai to confront Kreese. He saves Johnny just as Kreese is trying to strangle him and takes on Kreese in a one-on-one fight. After their fight takes them out into the strip mall parking lot, Daniel utilizes the pressure point strikes he learned from Chozen to immobilize Kreese as Kreese tries to attack Daniel with a shard of broken glass. With Johnny's approval, Daniel poises to strike a fatal blow, but Miguel and Sam's sudden arrival brings him back to his senses. Kreese, Johnny, and Daniel agree to temporarily cease hostilities in order to train for the tournament and come to a deal: if Cobra Kai wins the next All-Valley tournament, Daniel and Johnny will stop teaching karate, but if Miyagi Do and Eagle Fang win, Kreese will leave and shut down Cobra Kai. Daniel is also devastated to find that Robby has joined Cobra Kai after finishing his juvenile hall sentence and that Kreese is now grooming him to be one of his star pupils alongside Tory. Finding common ground with Johnny, the pair train together with their students at the Miyagi-Do dojo.

Season 4 
The philosophical differences between Daniel and Johnny causes a rift in the Miyagi-Do/Eagle Fang union, leaving the students of both factions confused. For a week, Daniel teaches the Eagle Fang students while Johnny takes the Miyagi-Do students under his wing. During this time, Daniel forms a bond with Miguel as he teaches him to drive and fix his mother's car. During this time, Daniel and Johnny discover that Kreese has teamed up once again with Terry Silver. Despite the higher stakes and Daniel revealing to Johnny his own experiences with Silver, their differences fail to subside and a drinking session leads to Johnny issuing a rematch with Daniel. The fight ends in a double-knockout with no clear winner before Johnny finally decides to end his partnership with Daniel after they have another argument in the wake of Cobra Kai attacking Hawk, who eventually joins Miyagi-do and goes back to being called Eli due to having his mohawk shaved off by Robby and the other Cobra Kai students.

Meanwhile, Daniel tries to teach Anthony Miyagi-Do karate but is disappointed when Anthony goes behind his back to pay someone from TaskRabbit to wash the cars for him and gives up on Anthony, though Anthony does warm up to Miyagi-Do after Daniel tells him a story about him and Mr. Miyagi when he looks through the karate scroll that Chozen gave Daniel and confesses to Daniel that he is jealous that everyone else in his family had more memories with Mr. Miyagi than he did. Daniel and Amanda are horrified when they learn that their son Anthony and his classmates have been suspended for bullying new student and Cobra Kai protégé Kenny Payne after Kenny fights off Anthony and his classmates in the middle school library. Daniel's cousin Vanessa, who is a child psychologist, deduces that Daniel and Amanda's lack of attention towards Anthony is the source of his problems. Daniel subsequently strikes discipline in Anthony by furiously breaking an iPad that Anthony snuck into his room despite being grounded and forbidden from using technology. In addition, a rift forms between Daniel and Sam as the latter has taken a liking to Johnny's style of karate due to Sam believing that Johnny understands her predicament with Tory and the other Cobra Kai students better than her own parents. 

Daniel enters his students in the All-Valley Tournament alongside Eagle Fang and Cobra Kai. During the tournament, Daniel is dismayed when he discovers that Robby has taught his fellow Cobra Kai students the Miyagi-do style of karate and confronts him. Robby insists that he will do whatever it takes to win and get revenge on Daniel and Johnny for abandoning him. In response, Daniel gives him a lesson to never put passion before principle, because even if he wins, it will mean nothing in the end. However, with Daniel's own students also using both styles of karate with success, he approaches Johnny and agrees to team up once more to defeat Cobra Kai during the final matches of both the boys and girls tournaments. Despite Eli defeating Robby for the Boys' Championship, both Miyagi-do and Eagle Fang lose to Cobra Kai after Sam loses to Tory for the Girls' Championship, which give Cobra Kai the most points overall.

Unbeknownst to Daniel, Silver secretly bribed the referee to rig the final match in Cobra Kai's favor and has gotten Kreese framed and arrested for charges of aggravated assault and attempted murder against former Cobra Kai student Stingray and has taken full control of Cobra Kai. Following the tournament, Daniel decides to renege on his earlier deal with Kreese to stop teaching karate after losing, and decides to take Johnny's advice on going on the offense. While paying his respects to Mr. Miyagi at his grave, he reveals that he has teamed up with Chozen to take down Cobra Kai once and for all.

Season 5 
Daniel begins his scheme to take down Cobra Kai with the help of Chozen, but Johnny declines to assist as he wants to focus on his own personal issues with Miguel and Robby. Upon learning of his plans, Silver attempts to dissuade Daniel by warning him that he will retaliate. Suspecting that Silver plans to reach out to Mike Barnes, Daniel approaches Barnes first, only to discover that Barnes has changed and is now running a successful furniture store in Agoura Hills. Having cut all ties to Silver and Cobra Kai, Barnes apologizes to Daniel for his actions against him in 1985 and offers to help Chozen and Daniel by giving them incriminating information, but Silver retaliates by burning down Barnes' store. Silver then works to drive a wedge between Daniel and Amanda by gaslighting Amanda into thinking Daniel is unhinged at an auction hosted by Silver, causing Amanda to storm off and return to her hometown in Ohio. Amanda eventually reconciles with Daniel after learning more about Daniel's negative history with Silver in 1985 from her cousin Jessica Andrews. During this time, Johnny helps a drunken and depressed Daniel to see the impact that his actions are having on his family while Daniel indirectly helps Johnny settle the differences between Miguel and Robby once and for all. After getting a tip from Tory that Kreese was framed by Silver, Daniel approaches Stingray to get him to confess against Silver, who responds by ambushing and severely injuring Daniel at Stingray’s apartment.

The subsequent fight leaves Daniel demoralized and unwilling to continue the fight against Silver due to Daniel being depressed about his resentment towards Silver straining his relationship with Amanda and his family. Knowing that they need Daniel's leadership to stand a chance against the rapidly expanding Cobra Kai, Amanda takes Daniel to Mr. Miyagi's house and gives him the advice that Mr. Miyagi had given her the night before their wedding. Robby, who has rejoined Miyagi-Do, reveals just how much Daniel's teachings had meant to him, something that he had finally understood when Robby had become a mentor himself to his friend Kenny, only to watch him become corrupted by Silver. With Daniel's students, Johnny and Chozen gathered as a show of support as well, Daniel is convinced not to give up and decides to re-open Miyagi-Do. At Amanda's suggestion, Daniel and Johnny reluctantly approach Kreese in prison for help and he reveals to them that Silver intends to enroll Cobra Kai in an elite international karate tournament, the Sekai Taikai, as part of his plan to make Cobra Kai a global franchise. In response, Daniel, Johnny, Chozen, and Amanda attempt to convince the committee that Miyagi-Do and Eagle Fang is the better choice, culminating in both sides being invited in. Daniel and Johnny, who continue to operate their dojos as the separate Miyagi-Do and Eagle Fang, are informed that they must choose a single name by the time of the tournament.

After learning that Johnny and Carmen are expecting a baby, Chozen, Daniel and Amanda spend the night celebrating at a nightclub with the couple. However, while on their way to another bar, a vengeful Barnes confronts Daniel by hijacking the limo and furiously demands retribution against Silver for the destruction of his furniture store. Johnny and Chozen agree to help Barnes, while Daniel refuses to help in his drunken state and subsequently ends up stranded in the middle of nowhere after Barnes drives the limo with Johnny and Chozen to confront Silver. Meanwhile, Daniel's students break into Cobra Kai with Tory's help to steal security footage of Silver's attack on Stingray and upload it to the dojo's YouTube channel. With the footage having been erased, they alternatively upload footage of Silver's confession to Tory about bribing the 2019 All-Valley Tournament referee, breaking the Cobra Kais faith in Silver. Daniel gets picked up by Stingray, who has a change of heart and agrees to help take down Silver by giving him a ride to the Cobra Kai dojo. In a final showdown, Daniel defeats Silver using the Cobra Kai techniques that Silver himself had taught Daniel before finishing the fight the crane kick. Silver is then arrested for his crimes by the police, as the Miyagi-Do and Eagle Fang students celebrate their victory. Daniel and Johnny are also informed by a detective that Kreese has been killed in prison, unaware that he had actually faked his death in order to escape and is planning on revenge.

Commentary
Daniel LaRusso, as conceived in the original films, is an iconic hero. Since the turn of the 21st century, however, Daniel along with Johnny have been more deeply developed. In 2018, LaRusso was inducted into the Fictitious Athlete Hall of Fame.

The thematic genesis for Cobra Kai began with a few works of pop culture. First, the 2007 music video for the song "Sweep the Leg" by No More Kings stars William Zabka (who also directed the video) as a caricature of himself as Johnny, and features references to The Karate Kid, including cameo appearances by Zabka's former Karate Kid co-stars. In a 2010 interview, Zabka jokingly discussed this video in the context of his vision that Johnny was the true hero of the film. Next in In June 2010, Macchio appeared in Funny or Die's online short, "Wax On, F*ck Off", in which his loved ones stage an intervention to turn the former child star from a well-adjusted family man into an addict besieged with tabloid scandal in order to help his career (with frequent references to The Karate Kid. A recurring joke in the sketch is that Macchio is confused for an adolescent. The short was lauded by TV Guides Bruce Fretts, who referred to the video as "sidesplitting" and "comic gold".
Finally, in 2013, Macchio and Zabka made guest appearances as themselves in the television sitcom How I Met Your Mother ("The Bro Mitzvah"). In the episode, Macchio is invited to Barney Stinson's bachelor party, leading to Barney shouting that he hates Macchio and that Johnny was the real hero of The Karate Kid. Towards the end of the episode, a clown in the party wipes off his makeup and reveals himself as Zabka. This influenced the launch of Cobra Kai, which gives a balanced perspective for Johnny, Daniel, and other characters. Zabka continued to be a recurring character throughout the ninth season of the show.

Also in 2013, Macchio voiced Daniel in an episode of Robot Chicken entitled "Caffeine-Induced Aneurysm".

References

External linksKarate Kid and Cobra KaiKarate Kid: Daniel and Mr. Miyagi auditions, 1983
Karate Kid: Ali and Daniel rehearsal, 1983
Karate Kid: Daniel and Johnny rehearsal, 1983
Karate Kid: The Lessons Come Together
Cobra Kai, Season 3: Daniel, Johnny & Ali Reunion SceneKarate Kid II and Cobra KaiKarate Kid II: No Mercy
Karate Kid II: Daniel, Chozen, Kumiko
Karate Kid Part II: Live or Die?
Cobra Kai, Season 3: Kumiko and Daniel reunion
Cobra Kai, Season 3: Daniel vs. Chozen
Cobra Kai, Season 5: Chozen Teaches Daniel A LessonKarate Kid III and Cobra KaiKarate Kid Part III (1989) - Refusing to Compete Scene
Karate Kid Part III (1989) - Blackmailed Scene
Karate Kid III: Miyagi Makes a Stand
Cobra Kai, Season 5: Cobra Kai: Daniel LaRusso using the Quicksilver MethodCobra Kai, Season 5'
3 Senseis
Eye of the Tiger

Film characters introduced in 1984
Fictional business executives
Fictional characters from California
Fictional characters from Los Angeles County, California
Fictional characters from New Jersey
Fictional Italian American people
Fictional Gōjū-ryū practitioners
Fictional male martial artists
Fictional martial arts trainers
Fictional salespeople
Male characters in film
Martial artist characters in films
Martial artist characters in television
Teenage characters in film
The Karate Kid (franchise) characters